The Polish language is a West Slavic language, and thus descends from Proto-Slavic, and more distantly from Proto-Indo-European. More specifically, it is a member of the Lechitic branch of the West Slavic languages, along with other languages spoken in areas within or close to the area of modern Poland, including Kashubian, Silesian, and the extinct Slovincian and Polabian.

The history of the language can be divided into four periods of development: Old Polish, up to the start of the 16th century; Middle Polish, from the 16th century until the end of the 18th century; New Polish, up to 1930; and Modern Polish, since 1930.

This page lists the most important changes that have taken place in the history of the Polish language.

Phonetic processes from Proto-Slavic 
 Prothesis of a voiced labiodental fricative before ǫ:
 ǫglь > vǫglь > węgiel ("coal")
 Palatalization (softening) of consonants before front vowels i, ь, e, ę, ě:
 sę >  > się (reflexive pronoun)
 bělъjь > biały ("white")
 Ablaut of vowels before hard (non-palatalized) alveolar consonants: e > o, ě > a
 nesą > niosę but nesešь > niesiesz ("I carry", "you carry")
 bělъjь > biały but bělitъ > bieli ("white", "whitens")
 The traces of the transition of ě into a in verbs after j, š, ž, č have disappeared
 slyšatь, slyšalъ, slyšalь > słyszeć, słyszał, słyszeli ("to hear", "he heard", "they heard"); compare Russian слышать (slyshat’)
 visětь, visělъ, visělь > wisieć, wisiał, wisieli ("to hang", "he hung", "they hung")
 The only remnants are stojatь, bojatь ("to stand", "to be afraid") > stojać, bojać in dialects of Wielkopolska – stać, bać in the dialect of Małopolska and in the literary language
 The disappearance of weak yers and the change of strong yers into e:
 pьsъ > pies ("dog (nom.)") but pьsa > psa ("dog (gen.)")
 sъnъ > sen ("sleep (nom.)") but *sъnomъ > snom ("dreams" (dat.))
 Formation of long vowels as a result of:
 contraction (synaeresis) of two syllables into one (ojo-type groups), for example: nogojǫ >  > nogą ("leg (inst.)")
 compensatory lengthening for the loss of yers
 preservation of the old length of intonation (from the neoacute accent)
 Proto-Slavic ę and ǫ were merged (after ę had palatalized a previous consonant)
 in the 12th century the pronunciation of ę and ǫ was lowered, eventually merging as 
 in the 13th and 14th century the only difference was in the vowel length, hence the common symbol ø for all nasal vowels
 Then, after the nasal vowels had merged, the disappearance of long vowels:
 >  > , written ó
  > , written ę (with loss of nasalization in some places); but  >  > , written ą
However in many dialects it became  (e.g. pon for standard pan "man") or retained the old pronunciation
 nesǫtъ >  > niosą ("they carry") but nesǫ >  > niosę ("I carry")
 bogъ >  > bóg ("god (nom.)") but boga >  > boga ("god (gen.)")
 kurъ >  > kur ("rooster")
 Metathesis of liquid diphthongs
 Palatalization of velars: ke, ky, ge, gy > kie, ki, gie, gi
 bogyni > bogini ("goddess")
 Strengthening of palatalization: sʲ, zʲ, tʲ, dʲ, nʲ > ś, ź, ć, dź, ń
 losь > łoś ("elk")
 Palatal assimilation
 gostь > gostʲ > gość ("guest")
 sъpi > spʲi > śpi ("is asleep")
 Loss of palatalization in certain environments
š, ž, č, dž, cʲ, dzʲ, rʲ (> ř > rz) and lʲ (note that hard l > ł  or ) lost their palatalization altogether:
 či > czy (interrogative particle)
 pʲ, bʲ, wʲ, fʲ, mʲ depalatalized when at the end of a word or before a consonant:
 golǫbь > gołãbʲ > gołąb ("dove")
 sʲ, zʲ, tʲ, dʲ, nʲ in some cases depalatalized before a non-palatal consonant:
 kotьnъjь > kotʲny > kotny ("(of some animals) pregnant")
 Simplification of consonant clusters
 kń > kś
 kъnędzь > kniądz > ksiądz ("priest")
 czs > cs > c, dźs > ćs > c, żs > szs > s
 czso > co ("what")
 lud – ludzki  < ludźski ("people" – "human (adjective)")
 bogaty – bogactwo < bogaćstwo ("rich" – "wealth")
 Bóg – boski < bożski ("God" – "divine")
 Włochy – włoski < włoszski ("Italy" – "Italian")
 Ruś – ruski < ruśski ("Rus', Ruthenia" – "of or relating to Rus'; Ruthenian")
 śćc > jc, dźc > ćc > jc
 miejsce < mieśćce < městьce ("place")
 ojca < oćca < otьca ("father")
 rajca < radźca ("councilman")
 źdźs > śćs > js
 miasto – miejski < mieśćski ("city" – "urban")
 ujazd – ujejski < ujeźdźski
 sześćset  ("six hundred")
 srʲ > sʲrʲ > śrz > śr, analogically zrʲ > źr (in dialects of Wielkopolska and Silesia: strz, zdrz, in the dialect of Małopolska: rś, rź)
 sreda > środa (dial. strzoda, rsioda) ("Wednesday")
 zrěnica > źrenica (dial. zdrzenica, rzienica) ("pupil")
 zgn, rgn, rgm > zn, rn, rm
 burgmistrz (cf. German Bürgermeister) > burmistrz ("mayor")
 rdc, zdn, łdn, cztw, stb, stł, stl > rc, zn, łn, czw, zb, sł, śl
 sьrdьce > sierdce > sierce ("heart (archaic)")
 cztwarty > czwarty ("fourth")
 ji > i (at least in spelling and while pronouncing clearly)
 dojitь > doić ("to milk")
 jixъ > ich ("their")
 l-vocalization
kolo > koło (initially , nowadays mostly ) ("koło")
 Word stress initially retained the mobile paradigms of Proto-Slavic, but then became initial, before finally becoming penultimate today.

Changes in grammar

Declension

Nouns 
The declension of nouns has simplified.  It now depends on the gender of a noun (smok, o smoku – foka, o foce) (a dragon, about a dragon – a seal, about a seal) and to some extent on the hardness of a noun's stem (liść, liście – list, listy) (leaf – leaves, letter – letters).  Two categories have appeared in the masculine gender: the category of animacy and that of personhood (but, widzę but, widzę buty – kot, widzę kota, widzę koty – pilot, widzę pilota, widzę pilotów) (a shoe, I see a shoe, I see shoes – a cat, I see a cat, I see cats – a pilot, I see a pilot, I see pilots).

Traces of consonant stems still remain but almost exclusively in neuter noun stems ending in -en, -ent- (cielę – cielęcia, imię – imienia) (a calf – of a calf, a name – of a name). For all other stems, the long or short form has become characteristic of all cases. In general, in the past endings characteristic of stems ending in -o-, -jo- and -a-, -ja- were most common. Other endings were disappearing. The endings which did not cause the alteration of the stem were becoming more popular. Traces of the lack of softness in some forms of words softened by front vowels (mainly forms ending with a consonant or ending with -i-, e.g. krъvaxъ > *krwach > krwiach) have disappeared. Often softness is the only remnant of old noun endings (Gen. kamane > kamienia) (of stone).

Singular

Nominative  
The disappearance of short forms of stems by the analogical introduction of the accusative noun form into the nominative.
 kamy > *kamy > kamień (kamenь) (stone)
 kry > *kry > krew (por. krъvь) (blood)

For neuter nouns the ending -ьje contracted to -é (weselé) (wedding). Names of ranks and appointments such as podkomorzé, due to the influence of names such as łowczy ("hunter"), came to be declined as adjectives from the 16th century: podkomorzy (chamberlain).

Genitive 
The ending -y has come to be applied to all feminine nouns.

The ending -a has come to be applied to all neuter nouns and to the majority of masculine nouns. In the 16th century, the ending -å, in other words non-acute -a, was applied to neuter stems ending in -ьje: oká (of an eye) but wesela (of a wedding).

After a period of frequent changes (which still has not ended) the ending -u is still applied to some masculine non-personal nouns, but there is no major connection with the original form.

Until the 16th century, the ending -ej, used in the declension of pronouns, was applied to all nouns in the genitive and dative and to feminine nouns in the locative if a noun had an old stem ending in -ja-: paniej, rolej, duszej (lord, role, soul).

Dative 
The ending -'e is still applied to feminine nouns with stems ending in -a-.

The ending -y is still applied to feminine soft-stem nouns. Occasionally, in the Old Polish ending -y was applied to neuter nouns with stems ending in a consonant: dziecięci, książęci (child, prince).

The ending -owi has come to be applied to almost all stems of masculine nouns.  Occasionally, it was applied to stems of neuter nouns.

The ending -ewi from Old Polish was sometimes applied instead of the ending -owi to the soft-stem nouns and in the 15th and 16th century it started to also be applied to hard-stem nouns.

The ending -u has come to be applied to all stems of neuter nouns. It is still applied to some masculine noun forms ending in -o-, -jo-.  Until the 16th century it was used more frequently, especially following the preposition ku (człowieku (human), głosu (voice), ku południu (towards the south)).

Accusative 
The accusative has remained the same as the nominative for all neuter nouns.

For masculine nouns, the accusative has remained the same as the nominative for inanimate nouns and for animate nouns it has become the same as the genitive.  The reason for this last change was most probably the free word order and the ambiguity that it could entail in phrases such as syn kocha ojciec (a son /nom./ loves a father /nom./) and ojciec kocha syn (a father /nom./ loves a son /nom./). The change of their forms into syn kocha ojca (son /nom./ loves father /acc./) and ojca kocha syn (father /acc./ loves son /nom./) helped to resolve this ambiguity. The accusative was the same as the nominative until the 14th–15th century (in the region of Mazowsze until the 16th century), and nowadays this feature is preserved in common phrases such as iść za mąż (to get married), siąść na koń (to mount a horse), na miły Bóg (dear Lord!), być za pan brat (to be on intimate terms with sbd.).

The ending −0 is still applied to stems of feminine nouns for which this same ending is applied also in the nominative.

The ending -ę is still applied to the typically feminine nouns.

In Old Polish the ending -ą was applied instead of -ę to nouns whose nominative ended with -å widzę duszę, boginię (I see a soul, a goddess) but wolą, pieczą (will, care).  Nowadays, the only remnant of this rule is the accusative form panią (lady).

Instrumental 
The ending -ą is still applied to all stems of feminine nouns.

The ending -em has come to be applied to all stems of masculine and neuter nouns.  The development of -ъmь, -ьmь has contributed to the stabilization of the use of this ending.

The ending -im < -ьjemь was applied to neuter nouns ending in the old -ьje: wiesielim, miłosierdzim (joy, mercy), wyobrażenim (imagination).

Locative 
The ending -'e is applied to hard-stem nouns. Until the 15th–16th century it was also applied to masculine and feminine nouns ending in -k, -g, -ch: Bodze (god), gresze (sin), mlece (milk).  For noun stems ending in -n-: We dnie i w nocy (during the day and night), but in general: w dniu (during the day).

The ending -y has come to be applied to all feminine soft-stem nouns.  Until the 14th–15th century it was also applied to a very small number of stems ending in -jo-, especially i < -ьji for neuter nouns ending in -ьje.

The ending -u has come to be applied to masculine and neuter hard-stem nouns ending in -k, -g, -ch.  It has also survived in forms o synu, domu (about a son, about a house) and is also present in the form o panu (due to the influence of the phrase w Panu Bogu) (in the Lord God).

Vocative 
The ending -'e (with -e, not -ě2, this is why there is the softening connected to the first palatalization) is applied to masculine hard-stem nouns.  Until the 16th century it was also applied to nouns ending in -k, -g, -ch. Nowadays it is present in forms such as Boże, człowiecze, Kozacze (also człowieku, Kozaku), and also księże, additionally after -ec: ojcze, starcze(father, old man) (connected with the third palatalization).

The ending -u has come to be applied to masculine soft-stem nouns ending in -k, -g, -ch and also feminine soft-stem nouns known as 'rodzinne' ('family nouns', used when addressing other family members) (ciociu, Helu) (auntie, Hela).  It has also survived in forms such as synu, domu! (son, home!).

The ending -o has survived in the old feminine nouns ending in -a- and has also spread onto the majority of old feminine nouns ending in -ja-.

The ending -y is still applied to feminine nouns which stems in the nominative end with a consonant (myszy, kości!) (mice, bones!)  and has spread onto the nouns of the same type as pani (lady).

The forms of neuter nouns in the vocative have remained the same as their forms in the nominative.

Plural

Nominative 
Until the 15th century the ending -i was the most widely applied ending to the stems of masculine nouns. From the 16th century onwards it was not applied to the stems of inanimate nouns, and from the 18th century – to the stems of nouns referring to non-persons.  Forms Włoszy, mniszy (Italians, monks) have been replaced by Włosi, mnisi with the phonetic softness introduced in the 17th century.

In the accusative -y was gradually replacing -i as the ending applied to the stems of masculine nouns.  Since the 16th century it was applied even to the stems of nouns referring to persons. It was popular especially in the Enlightenment (syny, wnuki, greki) (sons, grandsons, Greeks).  For feminine nouns it is still applied to the stems ending in -a- and also to some forms in the nominative singular ending in −0.

The ending -e, derived from the stems ending in -i- (gost-ьje, lud-ьje) (guests, people), -n- (dьn-e, kamen-e, mestjan-e) (days, stones, townsmen) and forms such as przyjaciele, cesarze (friends, caesars), have dominated soft-stem masculine nouns.  For feminine nouns it is still applied to the stems ending in -ja- and has spread onto some of the forms in the nominative singular ending in −0.

The ending -owie in the 14th–15th century was applied to all stems of masculine nouns. Since the 16th century it has been gradually disappearing, especially from inanimate nouns and those referring to nonpersons, still Norwid (1821–1883) used obłokowie (clouds) to make up a rhyme.

In the Old Polish, soft-stem nouns sometimes had the ending -ewie applied instead of -owie.

The ending -a is still applied to the stems of neuter nouns. Due to the influence of the Latin language, it has been applied since the 15th century to the stems of male nouns borrowed from Latin and German: akta, fundamenta, grunta, (files, foundations, grounds) and temporarily also to originally Polish nouns: okręta, pociska (ships, bullets).  Nowadays, applying the ending -a to the stems of masculine nouns is generally not possible, however:  akta (files)||akty (acts).

The names of offices such as podkomorzé until the 15th century also had the ending -a applied in the plural.  In the 16th century forms chorążowie podczasze podchorąże ma pod sobą were widely used; nowadays in the nominative it is chorążowie (warrant officers), in the dative podchorążych (of cup bearers).

The ending -´a (-´å) < -ьja today is used to construct forms such as brat – bracia  (brother - brothers), ksiądz – księża (priest - priests).  Initially, these forms were interpreted as collective nouns (bracia stała = braty stały) (brothers stood), księża poszła = księdzowie poszli (priests went), and were declined in the same way as female nouns (others of this type in the accusative had applied the ending -ą, in the genitive, dative and locative: -ej).  In the writings of Skarga (1536–1612) they were declined in the same way as plural nouns (braciom, braćmi, braciach, księżom, księżmi, księżach) (brothers, priests).  In dialect forms such as swaciå, muzykanciå, adwokaciå (matchmakers, musicians, lawyers)can be found.

Genitive 
The ending −0 has started to be widely applied to neuter and feminine hard-stem nouns. For soft-stem nouns the ending that is also applied is -y. Until the 17th century, its traces were present in the old masculine stems ending in -o-, -jo-: genitive woz (carriage), god, tysiąc (thousand), dziej, włos (hair). Nowadays, it is present in forms such as przyjaciół (friends), dotychczas (until now).

The ending -ów has become characteristic of the masculine hard-stem nouns, for soft-stem nouns the ending that is also applied is -y. In Old Polish it had a slightly different pronunciation and was more widely applied: pisarzow (of writers), koniow (of horses), dniow (of days), miesiącow (of months), in dialects: krolew (of kings).

For soft-stem nouns the ending that is also applied instead of -ów/-0 is -y.

Dative 
In the past, the ending -om has been widely applied to the stems of masculine and neuter nouns. Since the Middle Polish period it has started to be applied to the stems of feminine nouns.

In Old Polish -am prevailed as the ending applied to the stems of feminine nouns. In the 15th–17th century it was applied also to the stems of masculine and neuter nouns.

The ending -em until the 17th century was sometimes applied instead of -om to the stems of masculine nouns. There are no traces of this ending being applied to the stems of neuter nouns.

The endings -um, -óm in Old Polish were sometimes applied to the stems of neuter nouns instead of -om.

Accusative 
Initially, the endings -e/-y in the masculine accusative were distributed as endings applied to the stems of non-person nominative nouns. However, in the 17th century the accusative was made the same as the genitive. This change became common in the 17th century. Old accusative was and still is used for stylistic reasons: króle (kings), pany (masters), chłopy (peasants).

The forms of feminine and neuter nouns in the plural accusative have remained the same as in the plural nominative.

Instrumental 
In the past, the ending -ami has been most widely applied to the stems of feminine nouns.  Since the 15th century it came to be applied to the stems of neuter nouns and in the 16th–17th century, despite the resistance of grammarians, to the stems of masculine nouns.

The ending -mi was applied in Old Polish to the stems of masculine and neuter nouns, especially to soft-stem ones, and also to the stems of  some feminine nouns in the nominative ending with −0.  In principle, today it is only applied to the stems of masculine and feminine nouns in the nominative ending with −0 and having a phonetically soft-stem.

The ending -y was applied in Old Polish to the stems of masculine and neuter nouns, especially to hard-stem ones. Until now it has survived in phrases such as tymi czasy (these days).

The ending -oma, derived from the dual number, was applied to the stems of masculine nouns in the 16th–17th century.

Locative 
In the past, the ending -ach has been applied to feminine nouns. It could also be found in the masculine and neuter but came to be formally applied to nouns in these two genders in the 17th century.

The ending -'ech was applied in the Old Polish to masculine and neuter nouns, especially those with hard-stem: wilcech (wolf), syniech (son), skrzydlech (wings), leciech. The traces have remained in the names of countries: Na Węgrzech (in Hungary).

The ending -och was applied to nouns of all genders in the 14th–16th century, especially to soft-stem nouns and also to those ending with -k, -g, -ch, most probably because of the influence of the endings such as -owie, -ów, -om.

Vocative 
The plural vocative has remained the same as the nominative.

Mixed declension  
The mixed declension is characteristic of forms such as poeta (poet), mężczyzna (man), Jagiełło, Fredro, sędzia (judge).

In Old Polish forms such as starosta (prefect), poeta (poet) were declined like feminine nouns. In the 16th century the plural forms were changed due to their meaning (also plural dative such as mężczyznam).
 
Until the 17th century, nouns such as Fredro in plural had forms Fredra, Fredrowi, Fredrę and so on.

In the 15th century nouns such as sędzia < sądьja  (judge) were given in singular genitive, dative and accusative forms like adjectives. Later on, forms such as sędzim, sędziem (judge) appeared in the instrumental.  Sometimes the locative sędziej was also present.

Adjectives 
The declension of adjectives as nouns has almost disappeared (exception: pełen) (full).

The adjectival declension in combination with the pronoun jь gave rise to a new type of declension combining the two: adjectival and pronoun declensions. It is different from the noun declension: jego, tego białego słonia (his, of this white elephant).

Gendered pronouns 
The declension of hard-stem pronouns with genders has assimilated to the declension of soft-stem ones.
 těxъ > *ciech > tych jak ich (these as their)
 togo > *togo > tego jak jego (this as his)

Primarily, the singular feminine accusative ending was -ę.  The form ją (her) was the only exception. Due to the influence of adjectives the use of the form -ą came to be more widely applied. Nowadays, the only form with -ę is the prescribed tę (but informally most often tą).

Genderless pronouns 
They have undergone just slight changes:
 azъ > jazъ > jaz > ja ("I")
 mene > *mienie > mnie ("me")
 kogo > kogo (without any major phonetic changes)
 čьso > czso > cso > co ("what")

The old genitive čьso was transferred to the accusative and has spread to be applied to the nominative. The old accusative has preserved its prepositions: w niwecz < vъ nivъčь, przecz < prěčь, zacz < začь.

Numerals 
Ordinal, multiplicative and multiple numerals declined and still decline in the same way as adjectives.

Collective numerals 
The forms of collective numerals have been blended (portmanteau)
 masculine genitive dъvoj-a or dъvoj-ego > dwoj(e)ga (two)

Dual number 
The dual as a productive category has disappeared. Only some words for objects naturally occurring in pairs have generalized the old dual forms as the plural:  ("eyes", instead of the expected **),  ("ears", ** would be expected),  ("hands", ** would be expected), also in some proverbs:  – "Two words are enough for a smart head" ( is the modern form).

Conjugation 
The distinction between stems of the present tense and stems of the past tense was preserved.

Infinitive 
The ending -i disappeared (at first from endings *-cy < -ci):
 by-ti > *byci > być ("to be")
 nes-ti > *nieści > nieść ("to carry")
 dvigną-ti > *dźwignęci > dźwignąć ("to lift")

Present tense 
It has undergone just slight changes:
 nes-ą > niosę ("I am carrying")
 rek-ą > *rzekę > rzeczę ("I am saying"), exception: tłukę ("I am smashing")
 rec-i > *rzec(y) > rzeknij ? ("you say"), exception: tłucz ("you smash")
 nes-e-mъ > *niesiem > niesiemy ("we are carrying")

Many verbs changed their present tense forms by analogy:
 żywię – żywiesz > żyję – żyjesz ("I live" – "you live")
 grzebę – grzebiesz > grzebię – grzebiesz ("I dig" – "you dig")
 kolę – kolesz > kłuję – kłujesz ("I sting" – "you sting")
 porzę – porzesz > pruję – prujesz ("I tear" – "you tear")
 rostę – rościesz > rosnę – rośniesz ("I grow" – "you grow")
 kradę – kradziesz > kradnę – kradniesz ("I steal" – "you steal")
 łupam – łupasz > łupię – łupiesz ("I split" – "you split")
 kłamam – kłamasz > kłamię – kłamiesz ("I lie" – "you lie")

Instead of -ętъ for athematic verbs or for verbs with stems ending in -i-, the form -jątъ is used:
 dus-ętъ > *dusią(t) > duszą ("they strangle")
 dad-ętъ > *dadzią(t) > dadzą ("they will give")

Conjugation -am,-asz 
Based on the conjugation of athematic verbs, the new conjugation -am, -asz was introduced in verbs where contraction resulted in a long vowel in the ending (very rarely -em, -esz):
 gra-je-šь > *gra-je-sz > *gr-a:-sz > grasz ("you play")
 gra-je-tъ > *gra-je-0 > *gr-a:-0 > gra ("he/she/it plays")
 gra-je-mъ > *gra-je-my > *gr-a:-my > gramy ("we play")
 gra-je-te > *gra-je-cie > *gr-a:-cie > gracie ("you (pl.) play")

The 1st person singular changed by analogy to the athematic conjugation e.g. dam ("I will give"):
 gra-ją > gra-j-ę (until the 14th–15th century) > gram ("I play")

In the 3rd person plural the original vowel sequence remained uncontracted (compare athematic dadzą "they will give"):
 gra-ją-tъ > grają ("they play")

Past tenses 
The aorist and imperfect tenses inherited from Proto-Slavic disappeared. Only the first person singular ending of the aorist was retained in some dialects: byłech, byłek (= byłem) ("I was"). The aorist of być ("to be") was retained to form the conditional mood, was changed by analogy to the past tense and was subsequently reanalyzed as a particle.

The pluperfect is currently disappearing.

Future tense 
The present forms of perfective verbs retained their future meaning.

The future tense of imperfective verbs is still constructed by combining a conjugated form of będę with an infinitive or a past participle: będę chwalić or będę chwalił ("I will be praising").

Conditional 
The Proto-Slavic conditional form was replaced by an analitical construction composed of the aorist of the verb być ("to be") and the old L-participle. It then underwent analogical changes due to the influence of past tense endings.

Participles 
 The present tense active participle has come to be declined in the same way as adjectives. The present tense adverbial participle has also been introduced: gotujący, gotując ("cooking").
 The traces of the present tense passive participle have remained in forms such as świadomy ("aware of"), rzekoma ("alleged").
 The type I past tense active participle has remained in the form of the past tense adverbial participle: ugotowawszy ("having cooked"), kopnąwszy ("having kicked"), obdarłszy ("having stripped").
 The type II past tense active participle has become the base for the construction of the past tense (gotowałem) ("I was cooking") and also the future complex tense (będę gotował) ("I will be cooking"). It is still used with some intransitive verbs (zgniły, zmokły) ("rotten", "soaked").
 The past tense passive participle has remained animate: bity ("beaten"), poznana ("known"), wiedzione ("led").

Dual number 
The dual survived until the 14th–15th century with some slight changes:
 first person -vě > *-wie > -wa (due to the influence of the first person masculine dual: dwa konja) ("two horses").
 second person -ta > -ta
 third person -te > *-cie > -ta (became the same as the second person to be differentiated from the second person plural)

In the 16th century it disappeared from the literary language. Many dialects preserve dual verb endings, but with a plural meaning. The first person ending -ma is sometimes used as a result of merging -wa with -my.

chodźwa, chodźma (=chodźmy) ("let's go").

Only in the region of Tarnobrzeg does the distinction still exist for niesiewa, nieśwa (dual number) and niesiemy, nieśmy (plural) (we carry, let's carry).

See also 
 Old Polish language
 Middle Polish language
 History of Polish orthography

References

Sources 
 Stanisław Rospond, Gramatyka historyczna języka polskiego, PWN, Warszawa-Wrocław 2005
 Deputacya Od Król. Towarzystwa Warsz. Przyjaciół Nauk, Rozprawy i Wnioski o Ortografii Polskiéj, Drukarnia Józefa Węckiego, Warszawa 1830

External links 
 Edward Polański, Reformy ortografii polskiej – wczoraj, dziś, jutro, BULLETIN DE LA SOCIÉTÉ POLONAISE DE LINGUISTIQUE, fasc. LX, 2004, 

History of Poland
Polish language
Slavic language histories